Third Avenue is a Nigerian comedy film featuring three housemates who have different challenges and problems. The film is produced by Bami Gregs & Esse Akwawa and it is directed by Tope Alake. Third Avenue is a film series with 12 episodes released on 1 February 2021.

Cast 
David Jones David as Tboy
Jidekene Achufusi as Leo
Lilian Afegbai as Kimberly
Bami Gregs as Mia
Tope Olowoniyan as Pamela

Plot 
Tboy is not sure of the relationship he is with two of his girlfriends, Leo is barely coping as a gigolo, and the only female housemate, Kimberly despite being a caring lady finds it hard to get true love. Despite all their challenges, the three co-exist peacefully.

References 

2019 films
Nigerian comedy films
English-language Nigerian films
Nigerian comedy-drama films